{{Infobox college softball team
|name = Fresno State Bulldogs softball
|CurrentSeason = 
|logo = 
|logo_size = 200
| founded = 1978
|university = California State University, Fresno
|conference = Mountain West Conference
|conference_short = MWC
|city = Fresno
|stateabb = CA
|state = California
|coach =  Linda Garza
|tenure = 4th
|stadium = Margie Wright Diamond
|capacity = 3,288
|nickname = Fresno State
|national_champion = 1998
|wcws_runnerup = 1982, 1988, 1989, 1990
|wcws = 1982, 1984, 1987, 1988, 1989, 1990, 1991, 1992, 1994, 1997, 1998, 1999
|super_regional = 
|ncaa_tourneys = 1982, 1983, 1984, 1985, 1986, 1987, 1988, 1989, 1990, 1991, 1992, 1993, 1994, 1995, 1996, 1997, 1998, 1999, 2000, 2001, 2002, 2003, 2004, 2005, 2006, 2007, 2008, 2009, 2010, 2011, 2015, 2016, 2017, 2021
|conference_tournament = 
WAC1999, 2007, 2009

MWC2021
|conference_champion = 
NorCal1978, 1982, 1983Nor-Pac1985, 1986

Big West1987, 1988, 1989, 1990, 1991, 1992WAC1996, 1998, 1999, 2000, 2001, 2002, 2004, 2005, 2006, 2009

MWC2015, 2016, 2021
}}

The Fresno State Bulldogs softball''' team represents California State University, Fresno in NCAA Division I college softball.  The team participates in the Mountain West Conference. The Bulldogs are currently led by head coach Linda Garza. The team's assistant coaches are Jodie Cox and Justin Lewis.  The team plays its home games at Margie Wright Diamond located on the university's campus.

History

Coaching history

Year-by-Year Results

Championships

NCAA Women's College World Series National Championships

Conference Championships

Conference Tournament Championships

Coaching staff

References

 
Mountain West Conference softball